Kinathukadavu railway station Coimbatore-Dindigul railway line station of Coimbatore city.  It is located in the Coimbatore–Pollachi line. Train service resumed after gauge conversion works finished in 2017.

References

Railway stations in Coimbatore